The Philippine pygmy woodpecker (Yungipicus maculatus), also known as the Philippine woodpecker, is a species of bird in the woodpecker family (Picidae).  Its local name in Kapampangan is Anluage.

Distribution 
Smallest Philippine woodpecker, sexes differ, races fall into 3 groups: group 1 validirostris, maculatus and menagei with back moderately barred with blackish brown and white, throat white with dark spots or streaks, and rest of underparts heavily streaked black and  white; group 2 fulvifasciatus and leytensis with back boldly barred with black and white, throat whitish, upper breast whitish with distinct black spots and rest  of underparts finely slight or no barring on upperparts, but with large white patch on lower back and rump, complete red nuchal crest in male, narrow white throat, yellow breast faintly streaked with brown, and faintly streaked brown and buff bully.

Taxonomy
Formerly the taxon included the Sulu pygmy woodpecker (Y. ramsayi), which is now treated as distinct. These two and the Sulawesi pygmy woodpecker (Y. temminckii) appear to form a superspecies. Some taxonomic authorities continue to place this species in the genus Dendrocopos or Picoides.

Habitat
The woodpecker is endemic to the Philippines.  Its natural habitats are subtropical or tropical moist lowland forest and subtropical or tropical moist montane forest.

References

 A Guide to the birds of the Philippines (2000) Robert S. Kennedy pedro C. Gonzales, Edward C, Dickinson Hector C. Miranda, jr. & Timothy H. Fisher

Philippine pygmy woodpecker
Endemic birds of the Philippines
Philippine pygmy woodpecker
Philippine pygmy woodpecker
Taxonomy articles created by Polbot
Woodpeckers
Taxobox binomials not recognized by IUCN